Ascou is a commune in the Ariège department in the Occitanie region of south-western France.

The inhabitants of the commune are known as Ascounais.

Geography
Ascou is an alpine commune located some 40 km south-east of Foix and immediately east of Ax-les-Thermes. The northern border of the commune is the border between the departments of Ariège and Aude. Access to the commune is by the D 25 road which branches off the D 613 east of Ax-les-Thermes and continues through the village and the length of the commune to Mijanès over the mountains to the east. The D 258 road branches off the D 25 in the commune and goes north-east changing to the D 107 at the border and continuing to La Fajolle. Apart from the village there are the hamlets of Goulours, Lavail, and Pujal. The commune is entirely alpine in nature with no farmland.

The Ruisseau de l'Adorre rises in the east of the commune and flows west gathering tributaries and changing to the Lauze river before passing the village and continuing west to join the Ariège at Ax-les-Thermes. The Ruisseau de l'Eycherque rise in the north-east of the commune and flows south-west to join the Lauze at the D 25 road. The Riu Caud  flows from the north to join the Lauze at the Étang de Goulours

Neighbouring communes and villages

Administration

List of Successive Mayors

Demography
In 2017 the commune had 121 inhabitants.

Sites and monuments

The Parish Church contains a Statue of the Virgin and child which is registered as a historical object.

Notable people linked to the commune
Michel Naudy, journalist and politician.

See also
Communes of the Ariège department

References

External links
 Ascou on the IGN website 
Ascou on Géoportail, National Geographic Institute (IGN) website 
Ascou on the 1750 Cassini Map

Communes of Ariège (department)